Helen Eastman (1863–1953) was a botanist and author specializing in pteridophytes who wrote a beginner-level book on plant identification which included some novel identifications, credited to Eastman.

Written works
1904 – New England Ferns and their Common Allies

References

1863 births
1953 deaths
American women botanists
American botanists